Love Masisi is the stage name of Pierre Alexandre (born c. 1978), a Dutch-Haitian drag performer who has competed on the second season of Drag Race Holland as well as the second season of Queen of the Universe.

Masisi was born in Port-au-Prince, Haiti but moved to New Jersey at the age of eight with his family, and eventually attended Point Park University. Afterwards, he attended a program at the American Musical and Dramatic Academy then toured Japan alongside Gloria Estefan for one year. He established his drag career in Houston, Texas before moving to Amsterdam, where he was cast on the second season of Drag Race Holland, and placed eighth out of ten contestants. He was announced as apart of the cast representing The Netherlands on Queen of the Universe in 2023.

References

Living people
Drag performers
Drag Race Holland contestants
Queen of the Universe contestants
People from Port-au-Prince
People from New Jersey
Point Park University alumni
American Musical and Dramatic Academy alumni
People from Amsterdam